Bill Nations (born June 28, 1942) is an American dentist and politician.

Noble graduated from Noble High School in Noble, Oklahoma in 1960. He earned a bachelor's degree in history from the University of Oklahoma and obtained a degree in dentistry from Baylor University in 1968. Nations began working as a dentist in 1970. He was a member of the Norman City Council between 1986 and 1992, when he was elected mayor. Nations remained mayor until 1998, when he won his first Oklahoma House of Representatives election. He represented district 44 until 2010. Nations was term-limited, and succeeded in office by Emily Virgin.

Nations' wife Teena died at the age of 69 in August 2012.

References

1942 births
Living people
University of Oklahoma alumni
Baylor University alumni
American dentists
Democratic Party members of the Oklahoma House of Representatives
Mayors of places in Oklahoma
Oklahoma city council members